Hans Wolter (11 May 1911 in Dramburg – 17 August 1978 in Marburg) was a German physicist who designed an aplanatic system of grazing incidence mirrors that satisfied the Abbe sine condition (i.e. free of both spherical aberration and coma).
Wolter showed such a system could be produced using a combination of a paraboloid with either a hyperboloid or ellipsoid secondary. The three simplest designs are outlined and are known as Wolter telescopes of types I, II and III.

References

External links
 X-ray Imaging Systems 
 Wolter telescopes

20th-century German physicists
1911 births
1978 deaths
People from Drawsko Pomorskie
People from the Province of Pomerania